Charles Herbert Dickie (14 September 1859 – 16 September 1947) was a Conservative member of the House of Commons of Canada. He was born in Beachville, Canada West and became a lumberman, miner and railway employee.

Dickie attended schools at Beachville and at Ann Arbor, Michigan. He was a Conservative provincial politician at the Cowichan riding from 1901 to 1903.

He was elected to Parliament at the Nanaimo riding in the 1921 general election then re-elected there in 1925, 1926 and 1930. Dickie was defeated in the 1935 federal election by James Samuel Taylor of the Co-operative Commonwealth Federation.

References

External links
 

1859 births
1947 deaths
People from Oxford County, Ontario
British Columbia Conservative Party MLAs
Canadian miners
Conservative Party of Canada (1867–1942) MPs
Members of the House of Commons of Canada from British Columbia